Fleming Companies was founded as Lux Mercantile in Topeka, Kansas, in 1915 by O. A. Fleming, Gene Wilson and Samuel Lux. In 1921 the company's name was changed to Fleming-Wilson, and in 1941, the company name was changed to The Fleming Company, and Ned Fleming, son of O.A., was named president, chairman, and CEO. The company's IPO occurred in 1959, when 100,000 shares were offered. In 1981, R.D. Harrsion was elected Chairman and CEO of the company, with Dean Werries serving as President and COO. Starting in the 1960s, Fleming Companies began acquiring numerous grocery wholesalers and retailers, and it grew to become the nation's largest supplier of consumer packaged goods to U.S. retailers, serving approximately 50,000 retail locations. These locations included supermarkets such as IGA, convenience stores, supercenters, discount stores, concessions, limited assortment, drug, specialty, casinos, gift shops, military commissaries and exchanges and others.  In the early 1990s, Fleming was the largest food wholesaler in the United States. The company served more than 3,500 supermarkets and other retail food stores in 42 states and the District of Columbia.

Fleming became the nation's largest grocery wholesaler in 1991 with its purchase of Furr's Supermarkets; it lost that title in 1992 to SuperValu, but regained it in 1994 after its purchase of fellow Oklahoma City firm Scrivner Inc., the third-largest wholesaler.

In 1994, Fleming formed Fleming Supermarkets of Florida, Inc. whereby it inherited a chain of supermarkets in Florida (operating as Hyde Park Markets and Wooley's Fine Foods) and launched them as a Healthy Gourmet upscale Market where diet, nutrition and recipe programs were incorporated and rolled out by the company's Chief Nutrition Director, Donna DeCunzo, R.D., L.D. under the name Hyde Park Market. The 11 store chain was sold off by 2000.

The company moved its headquarters to Oklahoma City in 1984, and then to Lewisville, Texas, in 2000 before it went into bankruptcy.

Bankruptcy

Fleming Companies announced in April 2003 that it had filed for reorganization under Chapter 11 bankruptcy.  The company's fortunes had suffered considerably over the previous two years as the result of an investigation by the U.S. Securities and Exchange Commission into questionable business and accounting practices. Fleming had also faced a class-action lawsuit from its shareholders over the validity of its public statements, ended its relationship with its largest customer, Kmart, and saw its stock price drop to less than one dollar per share.  Peter S. Willmott, a member of the company's board of directors, was appointed to lead Fleming through reorganization.

The plan Willmott adopted provided for the reorganization of Fleming's debtors around Core-Mark, a wholesale distribution company founded in 1888 and acquired by Fleming in June 2002. Fleming's other assets and liabilities were transferred to two special-purpose trusts, to be liquidated.  All outstanding common stock in Fleming was canceled.

In August 2003, C&S Wholesale Grocers, Grocers Supply Company, Associated Grocers of Florida, and Associated Wholesale Grocers bought the wholesale grocery business of Fleming. On August 20, 2004, Core-Mark Holding Company, Inc. emerged from the Fleming bankruptcy under the direction of president and CEO J. Michael Walsh.  Core-Mark currently serves 20,000 retail locations in the U.S. and Canada, providing marketing programs and distribution and logistics services.  Core-Mark relocated its headquarters from South San Francisco to Texas.

References

External links

Retail companies of the United States
Companies that filed for Chapter 11 bankruptcy in 2003